Kissebaaz is a 2019 Indian Hindi-language mystery film written by Shekhar Ramesh Mishra, directed by Annant Jaaitpaal, and produced by Sanjay Anand, Divya Anand and Nishant Pawar under Experion Moviez. The film, starring Pankaj Tripathi, Anupriya Goenka and Evelyn Sharma, is set in Varanasi and narrates the story of a man (played by Rahul Bagga) who is victim of a plot of a wily narrator. The soundtrack was released under the banner Zee Music Company. It was theatrically released in India on 14 June 2019.

Cast
 Pankaj Tripathi as Chuttan Shukla
 Evelyn Sharma as  Bindass Babli
 Anupriya Goenka as Naina
 Rahul Bagga as Harsh
 Mouli Ganguly as inspector madam
 Zakir Hussain as Kripa Shankar Pandey
 Rajesh Sharma as D. D Shukla
 Pankaj Berry as Harsh Father
 Vikas Shrivastav as Inspector Rajender Jha
 Vinita Mahesh as Amrita 
 Jyoti Joshi as Naina’s Mother
 Rahaao as Shiv Pandey

Marketing and release
The first look poster of the film and official trailer were released in May 2019, and the film was released on 14 June 2019.

Reception

Critical response
Pallabi Dey Purkayastha of The Times of India giving the film one and half stars out of five, finds the script 'haphazard' and says, "Director Annant Jaaitpaal's political drama-turned-revenge saga is one long and painful movie about passionate love and the repercussions of it; cliche and boring."

Soundtrack

The music of the film was composed by Rohan Rohan with lyrics by Rohan Gokhale.

References

External links 
 
 

2019 films
Indian romantic thriller films
2010s Hindi-language films
Films scored by Rohan-Rohan
2010s romantic thriller films